Siamogale melilutra is an extinct species of giant otter from the late Miocene from Yunnan province, China.

Ranking among the largest fossil otters, Siamogale represents a feeding ecomorphology with no living analog. Its giant size and high mandibular strength confer shell-crushing capability matched only by other extinct molluscivores, such as the bear-like marine stem-pinniped Kolponomos.

Taxonomy

The skull reveals a combination of otter-like and badger-like cranial and dental characteristics. The new species belongs to the Lutrinae because of its possession of a large infraorbital canal and ventral expansion of the mastoid process, among other traits. Siamogale melilutra was about 1.9 m (6.25 ft) in overall length and weighed at least 40 kg (88 pounds). The remains of the skull were found in China and were re-created with a special program called the CT scan which is able to reconstruct the skeleton without being damaged.

References
4. Xiaoming Wang et al. http://www.sci-news.com/paleontology/siamogale-melilutra-giant-otter-04557.html

Prehistoric mustelids
Miocene carnivorans
Otters
Prehistoric mammals of Asia
Miocene species extinctions
Fossil taxa described in 2017
Paleontology in Yunnan